The DRDO Airborne Early Warning and Control System (AEW&CS) is a project of India's Defence Research and Development Organisation to develop an airborne early warning and control system for the Indian Air Force. It is also referred to as NETRA Airborne Early Warning and Control System (AEW&CS).

Development 
In 2003, the Indian Air Force (IAF) and DRDO carried out a joint study of the system-level requirements and feasibility of development for an Airborne Early Warning and Control (AEW&C) system. The government then approved the project for the development of the AEW&C system by DRDO. Primary responsibility for the project was with Centre for Airborne Systems (CABS), which led the design, system integration and testing of the system. Electronics and Radar Development Establishment (LRDE) was responsible for the design of the radar array. The Defence Electronics Application Laboratory (DEAL), based in Dehradun, was responsible for the Data Link and Communication Systems for AEW&CS.

The DRDO AEW&CS programme aims to deliver three radar-equipped surveillance aircraft to the Indian Air Force. The aircraft platform selected was the Embraer ERJ 145. Three ERJ 145 were procured from Embraer at a cost of US$300 Million, including the contracted modifications to the airframe. The project goal was to deploy these AEW&C aircraft by 2013. India's sole previous effort to develop an AEW&C system was the Airborne Surveillance Platform, but the programme, codenamed Airavat, was ended after the only test-bed crashed. The AEW&C project aimed to supplement the larger and more capable EL/W-2090 AWACS acquired by the IAF from Israel. Three EL/W-2090 systems have been ordered, with follow-on orders of 3 more expected in 2010. Apart from providing the IAF with a cheaper and hence, more flexible AEW&C platform as a backup to its more capable EL/W-2090 class systems, the DRDO AEW&C project aimed to develop the domestic ability to design and operationalise airborne surveillance platforms.

The delivery of six additional systems ordered in October 2010 is to begin from 2015. In June 2010, it was reported that the Indian Air Force is said to be looking at acquiring up to 20 additional systems, in addition to the existing systems on order.

Partners 
The responsibility between various DRDO laboratories is split as follows:

Electronics and Radar Development Establishment (LRDE)  – Primary radar
Defence Electronics Application Laboratory (DEAL) – Communication Systems and Data Link
Defence Avionics Research Establishment (DARE) – Self Protection suite, Electronic Support Measurement EW
Defence Electronics Research Laboratory (DLRL) – Communication Support Measures
Centre for Airborne Systems (CABS) – IFF & Overall Programme Management, integration and development of the data handling system, displays, mission computers et al.

Various Indian private sector firms are involved in the programme. National Aerospace Laboratories (NAL) of Council of Scientific and Industrial Research (CSIR) contributed to the aerodynamic studies of the antenna array, and flight modelling of the entire AEW&CS platform.

Design 

Two radiating planar arrays assembled back-to-back and mounted on top of the fuselage in an active antenna array unit (AAAU) will provide 240° coverage like Erieye. The AAAU is configured to compactly house 10 × 2 antenna array panels, 160 transmit receive 10 × 2 antenna array panels, 160 transmit receive multi-modules (TRMMs) dividers, beam forming units, beam control units, power supply units and related electronic devices including cables and connectors. This has been achieved through an innovative and iterative process to arrive at the AAAU with minimal dimensions and optimum mass properties. A unique feature of this Indian TRMM design is that eight trans-receive modules are combined compactly to form a single TRMM, thus facilitating high density installation of 160 of them in the AAAU to power the surveillance radar.

Additionally, the aircraft has other mission capabilities like identification friend or foe (IFF), electronic and communication support measures, C-band line-of-sight and Ku-band SATCOM datalinks, etc., similar to those on the AWACS and CAEW systems. The important modes of operation of the primary radar system are the surface surveillance and the air surveillance. The sensor has the abilities to search, track-while-scan, priority tracking, high performance tracking, etc. In priority tracking, the targets will be placed in full track mode even if these cross the primary surveillance area. In high performance tracking, additional measurements will be made to improve the tracking accuracy. Utilising active aperture technology, the radar provides a fast-beam agile system that can operate in several modes concurrently. Inter-operability with AWACS, other AEW&C aircraft, fighters and ground-exploitation stations is ensured using the data-links with voice and data channels. The aircraft cabin houses five operator work stations to adequately meet requirements of the operational mission tasks.

An air-to-air refuelling system enables extended operations at times of need. The endurance of the platform aircraft is about nine hours with one air-to-air refuelling.

Capabilities 

The AEWACS aircraft will have an active electronically scanned array (AESA) primary radar with IFF. The system will also have ESM (Electronic Support Measures) and CSM (Communications Support Measures) ability. Datalinks to network the AEW&CS with fighters, and ground-based control systems will also be provided, as will be the SATCOM (Satellite Communication System). The aircraft will also have a comprehensive self-defence suite. The avionics suite will be linked via a datahandling system, controlled by Mission computers.

DRDO's public overview of the AEW&CS aircraft stated:

 The Radar will have an extended range mode against fighter aircraft, and will consist of two back to back AESA arrays, with an additional dedicated IFF array.
 The ESM system will be able to track sources with a directional accuracy of 2 deg. RMS and a frequency accuracy of 1 MHz.
 The ESM system will have complete 360-degree coverage in azimuth and have a database of up to 3000 emitters against which threats will be scanned.
 Communication Support Measure system will analyse and record intercepted communications both inflight and post flight.
 Self Protection Suite will have a passive Missile Approach Warning System, a Radar Warning Receiver and countermeasures dispensers. The SPS will be integrated with the ESM and CSM suite.
 The aircraft will support Inflight refuelling.
 The aircraft will have SATCOM, and datalinks to pass on ESM, CSM and radar data to ground stations and datalinks to pass on target information to fighters. More than 40 other aircraft will be datalinked together by the AEW&C aircraft.

Status

The first round of modifications to the first EMB-145 fuselage for India's early warning aircraft were made in March 2011 in preparation for integration with the Indian-designed antenna.

In June 2010, it was reported that the Active Array Antenna Unit (AAAU), developed by DRDO's Centre for Airborne Systems (CABS), was to be integrated into the modified EMB-145 aircraft. First test flight of the system was expected in early 2011.

The first modified fuselage platform was handed over to DRDO by Embraer in February 2011. Ground and flight tests of the aircraft were to be followed by installation of radar and other equipment. The first fully modified EMB-145i Aircraft with the antenna and its electronic payload made its maiden flight on 6 December 2011 at Embraer facilities at Sao Jose dos Campos in Brazil with about 1000 Mission System Components provided by CABS, DRDO. These included the critical item – AESA (Active Electronic Scanning Antenna) Radar Antenna developed by DRDO and certified from ANAC, International FAR Certification Agency. at Sao Jose dos Campos in Brazil. Some of the sensitive advanced systems were replaced with dummy equipment of equivalent size and weight. These were to be integrated later in India following flight certification. A two-year certification period is expected. DRDO is expected to receive the next two aircraft platforms to start integration by mid-2012.

Embraer Defence and Security, on 16 August 2012 delivered the first EMB 145 Airborne Early Warning and Control (AEW&C) class of aircraft to the Government of India, in a ceremony held at Embraer's headquarters in São José dos Campos, Brazil. The delivery follows successful completion of ground and flight tests of the aircraft which met operational targets established by both Embraer and Centre for Airborne Systems (CABS) of Defence Research & Development Organisation (DRDO). Later on the aircraft will be delivered to the Indian Air Force after integration of missions systems of DRDO by CABS in India.

Maiden flight of the second fully modified aircraft for the Indian Airborne Early Warning and Control System (AEW&C) was held at 1930 IST on 4 April 2012 at the San Jose dos Campos in Brazil. The necessary mission systems and components including the dummy AAAU (Active Antenna Array Unit) are successfully fitted onboard Embraer EMB 145I aircraft.

Delivery
The first fully modified aircraft for India's Airborne Early Warning and Control System landed on Indian soil at Centre for Airborne Systems (CABS) Bangalore, a DRDO laboratory at 22:10 hours at HAL airport, Wednesday night at 22 August 2012. The acceptance of the aircraft was completed over a period of 15 days at Embraer Facilities in Brazil, by a joint team from CABS, Centre for Military Airworthiness and Certification (CEMILAC), Directorate General of Aeronautical Quality Assurance (DGAQA) and Indian Air Force (IAF).

The aircraft ferried with several mission system external components of DRDO including the (AESA radar) Active Electronically scanned Array Antenna with passive electronics fitted on the aircraft. The arrival of this aircraft marks the beginning of another phase of journey leading to the next major milestone of integration of the DRDO developed mission system, which will be followed by development flight trials in India beginning of 2013. It may be noted that this is the first aircraft delivered by M/s Embraer for which the contract was signed in 2008. The next aircraft is expected to arrive in December 2012.

IAF took delivery of the second NETRA AEW&C on 11 September 2019 and deployed it at Bathinda Air Base in Punjab. The third Embraer platform was meant to remain with DRDO but now they are looking at the option of selling the aircraft to a foreign customer as a major diplomatic gesture.

Operational history 

The first combat usage of the Netra AEW&C by the IAF was on 26 February 2019, during the Balakot airstrike. Indonesia has requested a systems demonstration.

Future development
DRDO and the Bengaluru-based Centre for Air Borne Systems (CABS) launched a new project to build larger and more capable AWACS. Initially, two AWACS aircraft were to be developed, with four more to follow at a later stage. Clearances for the project were received from the government in January 2013, and in March 2015 a decision was made to purchase two Airbus A330s, which was expanded to six planes in February 2017; the planes will also double as aerial refuelers.

By April 2019, DRDO proposed an upgraded Netra AEW&CS based on EADS CASA C-295 to the IAF as it already supports a static radar dome configuration. DRDO wanted C-295 to act as a common platform between currently used planar array radar with limited 240-degree coverage and the under development 360-degree static radar dome to save cost and time. Later on DRDO replaced C-295 for Airbus A-330 to make it act as both AWACS and aerial refueling tanker.

The Cabinet Committee on Security (CCS) in September 2021 cleared ₹11,000 crore project for six AEW&CS. The platform will be Airbus A321 that will be purchased from Air India and modified by DRDO as per military standards.

Users 

Indian Air Force : 3 in service

See also
 Embraer ERJ 145 family
 Embraer R-99
 Dassault Falcon 8X ARCHANGE
 Saab GlobalEye
 Raytheon Sentinel
 Gulfstream G550 CAEW Eitam

References

Military radars of India
Military equipment of India